In optometry, the least distance of distinct vision (LDDV) or the reference seeing distance (RSD) is the closest someone with "normal" vision (20/20 vision) can comfortably look at something. In other words, LDDV is the minimum comfortable distance between the naked human eye and a visible object.

The magnifying power (M) of a lens with focal length (f in millimeters) when viewed by the naked human eye can be calculated as:

See also
Optometry
Far point
Snellen chart
Visual perception
Visual impairment

References 

Optometry